Begonia imperialis, the imperial begonia, is a species of flowering plant in the genus Begonia, native to southern Mexico and Guatemala. It has gained the Royal Horticultural Society's Award of Garden Merit.

References

imperialis
Plants described in 1860